Bremer County is a county in the northeastern part of the U.S. state of Iowa. As of the 2020 census, the population was 24,988. Its county seat is Waverly. The county was named for Fredrika Bremer, a Swedish feminist writer.

Bremer County is included in the Waterloo-Cedar Falls, IA Metropolitan Statistical Area.

Geography
It is intersected by the Cedar and Wapsipinicon rivers.

Major highways
 U.S. Highway 63
 U.S. Highway 218
 Iowa Highway 3
 Iowa Highway 27
 Iowa Highway 93
 Iowa Highway 188

Adjacent counties
Chickasaw County  (north)
Fayette County  (east)
Floyd County   (northwest)
Black Hawk County  (south)
Buchanan County   (southeast)
Butler County  (west)

Demographics

2020 census
There were 10,484 housing units of which 9,646 were occupied.

2010 census
There were 9,915 housing units, of which 9,385 were occupied.

2000 census

As of the census of 2000, there were 23,325 people, 8,860 households, and 6,326 families residing in the county. There were 9,337 housing units at an average density of 21 per square mile (8/km2). The racial makeup of the county was 98.22% White, 0.48% Black or African American, 0.06% Native American, 0.52% Asian, 0.02% Pacific Islander, 0.10% from other races, and 0.60% from two or more races.  0.56% of the population were Hispanic or Latino of any race.

There were 8,860 households, out of which 32.00% had children under the age of 18 living with them, 62.50% were married couples living together, 6.20% had a female householder with no husband present, and 28.60% were non-families. 24.70% of all households were made up of individuals, and 12.70% had someone living alone who was 65 years of age or older.  The average household size was 2.47 and the average family size was 2.95.

In the county, the population was spread out, with 24.10% under the age of 18, 12.00% from 18 to 24, 23.90% from 25 to 44, 23.90% from 45 to 64, and 16.00% who were 65 years of age or older.  The median age was 38 years. For every 100 females, there were 93.60 males.  For every 100 females age 18 and over, there were 89.30 males.

The median income for a household in the county was $40,826, and the median income for a family was $50,299. Males had a median income of $34,212 versus $22,250 for females. The per capita income for the county was $19,199.  About 2.90% of families and 5.10% of the population were below the poverty line, including 4.20% of those under age 18 and 5.80% of those age 65 or over.

Education
Wartburg College is located in Waverly.

Waverly-Shell Rock School District

 Waverly-Shell Rock High school
 Waverly-Shell Rock Middle School
 Margaretta Carey Elementary School
 Shell Rock Elementary
 WSR Southeast Elementary
 WSR West Cedar Elementary
 WSR Lied Campus
 St. Paul's Lutheran School

Denver School District

 High school
 Middle school
 Elementary School
 Discoveries Preschool

Janesville Consolidated School District

Sumner School District

 S-F High School
 S-F Middle School
 Fredericksburg Elementary
 Durant Elementary
 Fredericksburg Preschool
 Sumner Preschool

Tripoli School District

Attractions
The Bremer County Fair is held at the county fairgrounds in Waverly every year in early August.  It celebrated its 135th year in August 2010.  Attractions include livestock and craft exhibitions, truck and tractor pulls, commercial and local exhibits, and various contests, performances, and concerts.

The Bremer County Court House, which opened in 1937, is listed on the National Register of Historic Places.

The Bremer County Historical Society and Museum was originally built in 1862 as a stagecoach stop and hotel.  It is listed on the National Register of Historic Places.

Communities

Cities

Denver
Frederika
Janesville
Plainfield
Readlyn
Sumner
Tripoli
Waverly

Unincorporated communities
Klinger
Siegel
Horton
Waverly Junction
Bremer

Townships
Bremer County is divided into fourteen townships:

 Dayton
 Douglas
 Franklin
 Frederika
 Fremont
 Jackson
 Jefferson
 Lafayette
 Le Roy
 Maxfield
 Polk
 Sumner No. 2
 Warren
 Washington

Population ranking
The population ranking of the following table is based on the 2020 census of Bremer County.
† county seat

Politics

See also

National Register of Historic Places listings in Bremer County, Iowa
Bremer County Court House

Notes

References

External links

County website

 
Waterloo – Cedar Falls metropolitan area
1851 establishments in Iowa
Populated places established in 1851